Sylvan Hills may refer to:

Places in the United States
 Sylvan Hills, Atlanta, Georgia, a neighborhood
 Sylvan Hills, Pennsylvania, a census-designated place
 Sylvan Hills Country Club Golf Course, Sherwood, Arkansas; listed on the National Register of Historic Places

Education
 Sylvan Hills High School, Sherwood, Arkansas
 Sylvan Hills Middle School (disambiguation), multiple instances